Soroseris is a genus of Asian plants in the tribe Cichorieae within the family Asteraceae.

 Species
 Soroseris depressa (Hook. f. & Thomson) J.W. Zhang, N. Kilian & H. Sun - Tibet, Bhutan, Sikkim, Nepal
 Soroseris erysimoides (Hand.-Mazz.) C.Shih - Gansu, Qinghai, Shaanxi, Sichuan, Tibet, Yunnan, Bhutan, Sikkim,  Nepal
 Soroseris glomerata (Decne.) Stebbins - Gansu, Qinghai, Sichuan, Xinjiang, Tibet, Yunnan, Kashmir,  Nepal, Uttarakhand, Pakistan
 Soroseris hookeriana (C.B.Clarke) Stebbins - Gansu, Qinghai, Sichuan, Tibet, Yunnan, Bhutan, Uttarakhand,  Nepal
 Soroseris pumila Stebbins - Tibet, Bhutan, Sikkim
 Soroseris teres C.Shih - Tibet, Bhutan
 Soroseris umbrella (Franch.) Stebbins - Sichuan, Tibet, Yunnan, Bhutan, Sikkim

References

 
Asteraceae genera